HMS Firm was a 60-gun fourth rate ship of the line of the Royal Navy, launched on 15 January 1759 at Blackwall Yard, London.

Her carpenter from 1775 was James Wallis, who had previously served aboard  with Captain James Cook on his second voyage to the Pacific.

She was on harbour service from 1784, and was broken up in 1791.

Notes

References

Ships of the line of the Royal Navy
Edgar-class ships of the line
1759 ships
Ships built by the Blackwall Yard